Cooper River may refer to:

Cooper River (New Jersey), a tributary of the Delaware River
Cooper River (South Carolina), a tributary of the estuary forming Charleston Harbor
Cooper River Historic District, near Moncks Corner, Berkeley County, South Carolina
Cooper Creek, a major inland river in Australia